Arctostaphylos catalinae, known by the common name Santa Catalina Island manzanita, is a species of manzanita native to Southern California.

Distribution
The plant is endemic to Santa Catalina Island, one of the southern Channel Islands of California.

The plant grows in maritime chaparral habitats, on the ridges of Catalina Island.

Description
It is glandular and covered in white bristles.

The leaves also have fine bristles. The dull, light green blades are up to 5 centimeters long by 3 wide.

The flowers are borne in an open, branching inflorescence with leaflike bracts.

The fruit is a spherical drupe up to 1.5 centimeters wide.

See also
California chaparral and woodlands — ecoregion.
California coastal sage and chaparral — sub-ecoregion.

References

California Native Plant Society-CNPS Inventory Plant Detail: Arctostaphylos catalinae — Rare, threatened, or endangered flora in California.

External links
 CalFlora Database: Arctostaphylos catalinae (Santa Catalina Island manzanita) 
Jepson Manual Treatment of Arctostaphylos catalinae 
USDA Plants Profile of Arctostaphylos catalinae (Santa Catalina Island manzanita) 
Arctostaphylos catalinae — U.C Photo gallery.

catalinae
Endemic flora of California
~
Natural history of the California chaparral and woodlands
Natural history of the Channel Islands of California
Natural history of Los Angeles County, California
Taxonomy articles created by Polbot